Mohd Pierre Andre Nazarul Andre (born 17 March 1985) is a Malaysian actor, director and writer. His role as Reza in the 2005 film Gol & Gincu was his first major role. Since then, he has since appeared in other films and TV series, as well written a screenplay, and directed his first movie.

After his last directed movie, Kecoh Primadona Kena Hantu was released in 2016, Andre went on indefinite hiatus from showbiz.

Personal life
He is the eldest child of the Malaysian actress Khatijah Tan and her husband, Nazarul Andre (born Philip Harry-Andre), who is of French descent. His younger brother is the Malaysian actor and director, Mikail Andre.

After becoming engaged on 9 February 2013, Andre married Siti Nur Hidayah Hashim on 23 June 2013. He has a daughter from that marriage.

Filmography

Feature films

Television

Television series

Television films

Frequent collaborators

Awards and nominations

Notes

References

External links
 
 Pierre Andre on YouTube

Living people
1985 births
Malaysian male actors
People from Kuala Lumpur
Malaysian Muslims
Malaysian people of Malay descent
Malaysian people of French descent